Conestoga was an iron-clad wooden steam freighter constructed in 1878. In 1922, Conestoga caught fire at Cardinal, Ontario and sank.

Description
Conestoga had a  hold.

Construction and career
The freighter was built in Cleveland, Ohio by Quale & Son for the Anchor Line of Erie, Pennsylvania. The vessel was launched on July 6, 1878.
On May 22, 1922, while awaiting passage through the Galop Canal Lock 28 (Old Galop Canal), a fire started in Conestogas engine room. The ship was flushed away from the lock and drifted downstream, where it burned to its waterline and sank. There was no loss of life and its cargo of 30,000 bushels of wheat was salvaged.

Conestoga is now a popular wreck dive where it sank in the Saint Lawrence River south of Cardinal, Ontario. The upper portion of the steeple engine protrudes above the river, marking the site.

References

External links
The Conestoga article (with pictures) on WikiScuba
Conestoga diving information from Geodiving
Archive of Conestoga papers 
Conestoga photos and information (French article) on Submersion-Images

Maritime incidents in 1922
Ship fires
Shipwrecks of the Saint Lawrence River
Steamships of the United States
Cargo ships of the United States
Grain ships
1878 ships